The P-5 "Pyatyorka" ("Pyatyorka", "fiver" in English), also known by the NATO codename SS-N-3C Shaddock, is a Cold War era turbojet-powered cruise missile of the Soviet Union, designed by the Chelomey design bureau. The missile entered service in 1959. Pyatyorka is a common name for the missile as the "digit 5", corresponding to the R-7 Semyorka, the digit 7.

The basic version of the missile was an inertially-guided submarine-launched cruise missile to threaten the US coasts. The missile could be armed with either a 1000 kg high explosive or a 200 or 350 kt nuclear warhead. 
It had a speed of about 0.9 Mach, range of 500 km and CEP of about 3000 m. The later variant had a range of possibly up to 1000 km.
The first missiles were installed in Project 644, Whiskey Twin Cylinder and Project 665, Whiskey Long Bin submarines.

Versions of P-5 were later developed equipped with radar homing to be used as anti-ship missiles. The last anti-ship versions were retired from active service about 1990, replaced by the P-500 Bazalt and P-700 Granit.

There were actually three versions of turbojet-powered, cruise missiles that were called "SS-N-3" by Western intelligence sources, with multiple variants. The earliest, P-5 was called SS-N-3c, and later versions SS-N-3a and SS-N-3b.
The various Russian designations are believed to be P-5 "Pyatyorka", P-6, P-7, and P-35 Progress. Some sources indicate that missiles 'P-10' and 'P-25' may also have existed.

NATO called the submarine-launched radar-homing versions of the P-6 SS-N-3A 'Shaddock'. These were carried by - and s for targeting US aircraft carriers. The Echo I-class submarines were incapable of accommodating the targeting radar for the anti-ship version, and were not equipped with missiles after the land-attack variant was withdrawn, probably in the mid-1960s when sufficient nuclear-powered ballistic missile submarines (SSBNs) became available.

 
Russian sources indicate that there was only submarine-launched version of P-5. The surface-launched, radar-homing version called P-35 was used by - and -class guided-missile cruisers. The P-7 was possibly a longer-ranged version of the P-5, or a further development of the P-6.

There were also land-based versions of these missiles transported in and launched from an eight-wheel truck (ZIL-135KM) as coastal defense missiles. These were designated SPU-35V "Redut" or NATO "SSC-1 Sepal". Yugoslavia deployed this system on the island of Vis.

Specifications

Length: 10.20 m (a/b) or 11.75 m (model C)
Diameter: 0.98m
Wingspan: 5 m
Weight: 5000 kg
Propulsion: turbojet with launch rocket boosters
Speed up to Mach 0.9
Range: 450 km (a/b), 750 km (model C)
Guidance: inertial guidance with mid-course update via data link. Terminal active radar homing in conventional-armed versions.
Warhead: 1000 kg conventional or 200-350 kt nuclear

Deployment

This missile was deployed on the following ships;
 Whiskey Single Cylinder submarines (Land-attack version)
 Whiskey Twin Cylinder submarines (Land-attack version)
 Whiskey Long Bin submarines (Land-attack version)
 s
 s
 s
 s

The Lake Inari incident

On 28 December 1984 a SS-N-3 missile used as a target by the Soviet Navy strayed over the Finnish border and crashed into Lake Inari. A Finnish early warning radar at Rovaniemi and a close-range radar at Kaamanen picked it up, and two Saab 35 Draken fighters were dispatched, but were unable to find anything. A few days later, a reindeer herder found a plastic cover of the electronics compartment, and unable to identify it, brought it to a Border Guard post. Finnish military analysts recognized it as a MiG component. Indeed, the missile was a modified version fitted with avionics taken from MiG for remote control. The missile had punched itself through the lake ice, thus the crash site was easily identifiable, and the Finnish military soon lifted the missile from the lake for analysis. The likely cause was loss of radio contact between the operator and the missile. Although the cause for the accident was mundane, it came at an unfortunate time, just before an international conference on cruise missiles, and there was much speculation whether it was a Soviet show of force.

Operators
 previous

 operational
 - main

 
 P-35 Redut Geum Seong 2 금성-2호 GS-3 (SSC-1b SSN3b Sepal), P-20

 unknown

Variants 
 P-5 GRAU 4K34 SS-N-3c
 P-5D modification
 P-6 SS-N-3a Shaddock
 S-35 SSC-1a 1b Shaddock TEL
 P-35  SS-N-3b Sepal
 3M44 Progress SSC-1B Sepal, modernized version
 P-35B GRAU 4K44B coastal AShM, GLCM complex Redut SS-N-3b SSC-1B
 Utjos Utes Sotka or Object 100 using P-35B, 3M44 Progress, P-6 S-35, maybe also a modernized modified variant of P-5, Утёс - объект 100 or Сотка, Sevastopol' Balaklava military zone

References

http://www.globalsecurity.org/military/world/russia/ss-n-3-specs.htm
https://fas.org/nuke/guide/russia/theater/ss-n-3.htm
http://www.janes.com/articles/Janes-Strategic-Weapon-Systems/P-6710-and-P-535-SS-N3-Shaddock-and-SSC-1-Sepal-Russian-Federation.html
http://warships.ru/Russia/Weapons/PKR/P-35/index2.html
 Gardiner, Robert and Chumbley, Stephen, Conway's All the World's Fighting Ships 1947–1995, Naval Institute Press, 1996. .

External links
 MARITIME STRIKE The Soviet Perspective
 SSC-1a Shaddock and SS-N-3 Sepal at Federation of American Scientists

P-005
P-005
Cruise missiles of the Cold War
Cold War nuclear missiles of the Soviet Union
Surface-to-surface missiles
Submarine-launched cruise missiles
Military equipment introduced in the 1950s